The name Yutu has been used to name four tropical cyclones in the northwestern Pacific Ocean. The name was submitted by China and literally means "Jade rabbit".

 Severe Tropical Storm Yutu (2001) (T0107, 10W, Huaning) – impacted China.
 Typhoon Yutu (2007) (T0702, 02W, Amang)
 Tropical Storm Yutu (2013) (T1316) – Recognized as a tropical storm only by the JMA; the JTWC instead classified it as a subtropical depression.
 Typhoon Yutu (2018) (T1826, 31W, Rosita) - A category 5 super typhoon which devastated the Mariana Islands and the Philippines.

The WMO Typhoon Committee retired Yutu from use in the Western Pacific after the 2018 season, and has chosen Yinxing (the Chinese name for the ginkgo tree) to replace it.

Pacific typhoon set index articles